Leslie Kean is an investigative journalist and author who is most notable for books about UFOs and the afterlife.

Background
In the late nineteen-nineties, after a visit to Burma to interview political prisoners, she stumbled into a career in investigative journalism. She took a job at KPFA, a radio station in Berkeley, as a producer and on-air host for “Flashpoints,” a left-wing drive-time news program, where she covered wrongful convictions, the death penalty, and other criminal-justice issues.

Kean is the daughter of environmentalist and philanthropist Hamilton Fish Kean and the granddaughter of Congressman Robert Kean. Her uncle is former New Jersey Governor Tom Kean Sr., and her cousin is New Jersey State Senator Tom Kean Jr. 
She attended Spence School and  Bard College, and helped "to found a Zen center in upstate New York".

Career
Kean  Worked as a photographer at the Cornell Lab of Ornithology. After visiting Burma to interview political prisoners, in the 1990s she began working at a Berkeley radio station (KPFA, the flagship station of the Pacifica Radio Network) as an investigative journalist, producer and on-air host for 'Flashpoints,' a left-wing drive-time news program, covering wrongful convictions, the death penalty, and other criminal-justice issues. 

Kean has published works relating to UFOs since 2000, and has been a guest on Coast to Coast AM. Her book UFOs: Generals, Pilots and Government Officials Go on the Record, published by Penguin Random House, was a New York Times best seller. Kean belongs to the UFO organization UFODATA.

On 16 December 2017, the New York Times featured an article written by Helene Cooper, Ralph Blumenthal and Kean, which revealed the fact that the US Department of Defense had spent $22.5M on a secret program titled the Advanced Aerospace Threat Identification Program that investigated UFOs.

Written works
 1994. Burma's Revolution of the Spirit: The Struggle for Democratic Freedom and Dignity  – with Alan Clements. . 
 2010. UFOs: Generals, Pilots and Government Officials Go on the Record - with a foreword by John Podesta, Harmony Books, New York. .
 2017. Surviving Death: A Journalist Investigates Evidence for an Afterlife. .

References

External links
 Leslie Kean's Official Website

Living people
Kean family
Winthrop family
Year of birth missing (living people)
Place of birth missing (living people)
American investigative journalists
American UFO writers